Dempo Sports Club is an Indian professional association football club based in Goa. The club was formed in Goa in 1968.

Dempo have won the League championship 4 times, and the Federation Cup once. They were though the winners of the 2006 National Football League Second Division.

Key

 P = Played
 W = Games won
 D = Games drawn
 L = Games lost
 F = Goals for
 A = Goals against
 Pts = Points
 Pos = Final position

 Div 1 = National Football League
 Div 2 = National Football League Second Division
 IL = I-League

 F = Final
 Group = Group stage
 R16 = Round of 16
 QF = Quarter-finals

 R1 = Round 1
 R2 = Round 2
 R3 = Round 3
 R4 = Round 4
 R5 = Round 5
 R6 = Round 6
 SF = Semi-finals

Seasons

References

 
Dempo S.C.
Dempo S.C.